Rob Shepardson is a political consultant and marketing strategist, who in April 2014 was named by Barack Obama to the President's Council on Fitness, Sports and Nutrition (PCFSN).  He had become known for his work on the Barack Obama presidential campaigns of 2008 and 2012, as a member of the paid media team. Shepardson's marketing communications firm, SS+K was tasked with registering and winning the support of millennials (18- to 34-year-olds).  In 2008, 66% of those under 30 voted for Barack Obama. In 2012, 1.25 million more millennials voted for Obama than in 2008, tipping swing states such as Florida, Virginia, Pennsylvania and Ohio in his favor.

Shepardson is a co-founder and partner of SS+K, a New York-based advertising agency. In addition to political work, the firm also has non-profit clients that include the LIVESTRONG Foundation, the Bill & Melinda Gates Foundation, and Bono's ONE Campaign, as well as a range of corporate clients that include HBO, Starbucks, Microsoft, Wells Fargo, Lyft, WhatsApp, Airbnb, and The New Yorker.

Strategy for reaching millennials
Shepardson maintains that young voters have little trust in Washington, D.C., regardless of the political party in power. “Millennials will align with somebody regardless of political labels, based on values. Communicate through issues, not through the candidate,” he advises. “Negative ads and politics-as-usual can turn millennials off. They are quite shrewd when it comes to marketing.” The best strategy to reach them, he suggests, is to “sell a politician by not being political.”

Political communications
Examples of Shepardson's political communications work with SS+K include:
 For the Biden-Harris Campaign, Shepardson and SS+K were asked to create important video segments for the Democratic National Convention. One showed the 2020 Democratic contenders unified behind the Biden-Harris ticket; another, contrasting the ticket's approach to gun violence vs. the status quo, featured Stoneman Douglas High School shooting survivor Emma Gonzalez. A third segment which ran on the convention's final night featured the Democratic candidates sharing their favorite Joe Biden memories. 
During the NBA playoffs, Shepardson and the firm launched the We Got Next campaign for Lebron James' More Than a Vote and the NAACP Legal Defense Fund, aimed at recruiting young people to serve as poll workers during the 2020 election. The effort succeeding in recruiting over 10,000 volunteers to work the polls. A second phase of the campaign launched after the Lakers' championship win, urging their audience to make a plan to vote.
Your First Time (2012) – Targeting first-time voters, this tongue-in-cheek campaign for the Obama For America presidential campaign featured a video of author and director Lena Dunham, who slyly compared voting to losing one's virginity. "Your first time shouldn’t be with just anybody," Dunham says. "You want to do it with a great guy." TIME Magazine called the Dunham spot the "most memorable ad of the 2012 campaign". The video won a Digiday Sammy Award for "Best Branded Viral Video". The sexual innuendo was both applauded and condemned along party lines, with liberal commentators cheering the humor and conservatives calling it “tasteless".
For All (2012) – SS+K developed a second Obama For America ad campaign in 2012 called "For All" that included video, social media and print ads. It invited young voters to write an issue they cared about on their hand, photograph it and share it on Instagram. This campaign won a Digiday Sammy Award for "Best Social Engagement Campaign".
Democratic National Committee Rebranding (2010) – The agency redesigned the Democratic National Committee logo, moving away from a kicking red, white and blue donkey to a bold blue "D" inside a thick blue circle with the slogan "Change That Matters".
Obama for America Youth Campaign (2008) – SS+K developed the “Don’t Get Mad, Vote” campaign in 2008. It drove young voters to VoteForChange.org, the Obama campaign's voter registration site. On Election Day 2008, Barack Obama won the highest percentage of the youth vote (66 percent) since exit polling began in 1972. The Obama campaign, including the paid media team of which SS+K was a member, won the Cannes Titanium and Integrated Gold Lion advertising awards.

Advocacy campaigns 
Shepardson has led SS+K's work for issue campaigns and nonprofits, including:
 LIVESTRONG Foundation (formerly the Lance Armstrong Foundation) – To empower cancer survivors through advocacy and support programs.
 FWD.us – Founded by Mark Zuckerberg and other Silicon Valley executives, supporting comprehensive immigration reform.
 Share Our Strength - To eliminate childhood hunger in the United States through the No Kid Hungry campaign.
 Sandy Hook Promise – Founded by parents of the victims of the December 2012 Sandy Hook Elementary School massacre, to protect children from gun violence.
 Let's Move! – Founded by First Lady Michelle Obama, a first-of-its-kind campaign to reduce childhood obesity in a generation.
 Enough! – Housed at the Center for American Progress, an advocacy campaign to fight genocide.
 Bill & Melinda Gates Foundation – To improve the quality of lives for individuals around the world through issues including global health and education.
 ONE Campaign – Co-founded by Bono, the advocacy campaign to reduce extreme poverty and preventable disease, especially in Africa.
In addition, Shepardson has led SS+K's work for many commercial clients, including the recent, award-winning campaign for HBO called "Awkward Family Viewing," promoting the HBO Go service to college students. The campaign won multiple media accolades, and some of the advertising industry's top awards, including five Cannes Lions and 11 One Show Pencils.

Public service appointments 
In 2014, President Barack Obama appointed Shepardson to the President's Council on Fitness, Sports and Nutrition (PCFSN), along with NBA players Jason Collins and Alonzo Mourning, celebrity chef and talk show host Rachael Ray, and ballet dancer Misty Copeland. Shepardson is also a member of the Council on Foreign Relations (CFR) and several business and charitable boards, including the New York advisory board of Enterprise Community Partners (ECP) and the advisory board of the Center for Health Communication at Harvard University's School of Public Health.
He developed and taught a graduate-level course on health issue advocacy at Columbia University's Mailman School of Public Health in 2003 and 2004.

Career 
With fellow political consultants Lenny Stern and Mark Kaminsky, Rob Shepardson founded the New York City-based advertising and communication agency SS+K in 1993.  In November 2014, SS+K sold a 33% stake to international advertising agency M&C Saatchi.   
From 1987 to 1993, Shepardson was a managing director at the Sawyer/Miller Group, an international political consulting firm. Prior to joining Sawyer/Miller, Shepardson worked as a special assistant to future Pennsylvania Governor Ed Rendell when Rendell was District Attorney in Philadelphia.

Personal 
Shepardson received a B.A. from Franklin & Marshall College, Lancaster, Pa. and an M.P.P. from the John F. Kennedy School of Government at Harvard University. Shepardson was inducted into the Franklin & Marshall Sports Hall of Fame, having set a number of records as a four-year starting quarterback. Shepardson finished the 2014 Boston Marathon in 3:36.

References

External links
 SS+K Website
To energize young voters, Biden must recapture spirit of 2008 campaign, by Rob Shepardson, The Hill 4/30/20
 A Manifesto for Young Voters, article by Rob Shepardson and Mark MacKinnon in The Daily Beast, 5/4/09
 Adweek: "SS+K hired by New Yorker"
 President's Council on Fitness, Sports & Nutrition
 The New York Times: Like a Politician, Delta Hits the Comeback Trail
 (Textbook) Advertising Campaigns: Start to Finish "Meet SS+K"
 (Textbook) Launch! Advertising and Promotions in Real Time, v. 1.0, by Michael R. Solomon
 Why Political Professionals Think Biden Can Win, self-published article on Medium, October 24, 2020.
 How Biden Ran The Ultimate Purpose-Driven Campaign, opinion piece published in AdWeek, November 9, 2020
 How Do You Deliver Hope in a Hopeless Time?, opinion piece published in Little Black Book, November 13, 2020.

Date of birth missing (living people)
Living people
Harvard Kennedy School alumni
Franklin & Marshall College alumni
Year of birth missing (living people)